WLVH (101.1 FM) is an iHeartMedia, Inc.-owned urban adult contemporary radio station in Savannah, Georgia, licensed to Hardeeville, South Carolina. The station uses the branding "Love 101.1".  Its studios are located in Garden City (with a Savannah address) and utilizes a transmitter located west of Savannah in Bloomingdale, Georgia along Interstate 16.

WLVH was the Savannah, Georgia affiliate of the Tom Joyner Morning Show until it ended on December 13, 2019, and was replaced by The Steve Harvey Morning Show. It also has a nighttime slow-jam show The Keith Sweat Hotel.

External links
Love 101.1 official website

Urban adult contemporary radio stations in the United States
LVH
IHeartMedia radio stations